Manuel Jeannin (born 1 November 1975), known professionally as Manuel Ferrara, is a French pornographic actor and director.

One of the leading actors in the porn industry, Ferrara has won over 64 adult industry awards including six AVN Awards as Male Performer of the Year—the record for the accolade, and was inducted into the AVN and XRCO Halls of Fame.

Early life 
Ferrara was born in Le Raincy, France, and raised in nearby Gagny. He was born to a French father and a Spanish mother. His father was an electrician and his mother was a cleaning lady who had immigrated to France. His father died when Ferrara was 17. He studied to become a P.E. teacher.

Career 
Ferrara shot his first hardcore scene in 1997 during his studies, after answering an ad in a French pornographic magazine. He then started a career as a professional porn actor, appearing in various French and European productions. He chose the stage name Manuel Ferrara because of his passing resemblance to boxer-turned-actor Stéphane Ferrara.

Ferrara became a protégé of Rocco Siffredi, who recommended him for a role in John Stagliano's Fashionistas in which he made his American debut. In 2002, he appeared in blockbuster hit Snoop Dogg's Hustlaz: Diary of a Pimp. In 2003, he started directing gonzo pornography for Platinum X Pictures, a subsidiary of Red Light District Video. In 2004, he began directing for Red Light.

After working for Red Light District for  the two years, Ferrara began directing for Evil Angel in May 2006. His first Evil Angel film was Evilution, starring Naomi, Melissa Lauren and featuring the comeback of Nici Sterling. Since then, he has directed several porn series, including Fucked on Sight, Slutty & Sluttier, Raw, Evil Anal, Battle of the Sluts, Anal Expedition, Teen Cum Squad, Bangin' Black Boxes, Ass Attack, I'm Your Slut, Mindfuck and New Whores on the Block.

On 23 December 2010, Ferrara appeared alongside Riley Steele in an episode of Manswers titled "Airplane Plane Hanger-On" to discuss their careers for the segment "How Can You Become A Porktastic Porn Star".

On 22 January 2012, he became the first actor in history to win AVN's Male Performer of the Year four times.  He won AVN's Male Performer of the Year for a fifth time on 18 January 2014.

Ferrara performed in about 2,200 videos in his pornographic career.

In 2012, Ferrara appeared alongside pornographic actress Zoe Voss in an explicit sex scene for the mainstream film Starlet.

Personal life 
Ferrara was married to pornographic actress Dana Vespoli in January 2005. The couple divorced seven years later. They have three sons together. Ferrara has a daughter with his partner, American pornographic actress and director Kayden Kross. His mother died in March 2021 due to COVID-19.

Awards and nominations

References

External links 

 
 
 
 

1975 births
French expatriates in the United States
French male pornographic film actors
French pornographic film directors
Living people
People from Gagny
French people of Spanish descent
Twitch (service) streamers